John Flerlage (born 1958) is a retired U.S. Marine Corps Lieutenant Colonel and the former Democratic nominee for U.S. House of Representatives in Colorado's 6th congressional district. He is currently a Boeing 767 captain flying international routes for Delta Air Lines. Flerlage is a member of the Air Line Pilots Association, International, Veterans of Foreign Wars, and the Chamber of Commerce.

Early life, education and career
Flerlage was born in Boston on January 29, 1958. His father, Stuart Q. Flerlage, Jr., was born in Cincinnati, OH. He moved to Cambridge, MA to attend Harvard College. He later attended Harvard Medical School and the Episcopal Divinity School. He practiced psychiatry for over 30 years in Brookline and Waltham, MA, until 1989 when he died. He had six children, five boys consecutively, with John being the third, and a daughter. John’s mother, Dr. Patricia Ewalt, was born in Newton, MA. While raising four boys, she completed her doctorate in social work and eventually became Dean of the School of Social Work at the University of Kansas. She later retired from the same position at the University of Hawaii.

Flerlage lived in Massachusetts, Maine, Virginia, Florida, Texas, Arizona and California during his school and Marine Corps years. While a freshman at Colby College in Waterville, Maine, Flerlage joined the Marine Corps officer training program in 1977. He earned a BA in mathematics from Colby College in 1980, and furthered his education by completing the requirements of the Air Force Air War College.

Marine Corps career
Flerlage served 22 years in the Marine Corps before retiring as a Lieutenant Colonel from the Marine Corps Reserve in 2000. Over his eleven active-duty years and eleven years in the Reserves, Flerlage flew the F/A-18 Hornet and A-4 Skyhawk in historic squadrons such as the VMA-214 Blacksheep, operating in California, Japan, South Korea and the Philippines, and the VMFA-142 Flying Gators (based in Florida and Georgia). He served in various Squadron and Group level leadership and staff positions; and taught classes in world affairs, strategic commitments and the implementation of fighters and other tactical aircraft at the Marine aviation advanced tactics school (Marine Aviation Weapons and Tactics Squadron 1).

Political career
Flerlage has been active in local (Jefferson County) politics, serving at the precinct (PCP) and house district level (Treasurer HD 28).  He has also volunteered on local, congressional, and presidential campaigns.  Flerlage is currently a member of the leadership team of the South JeffCo Democrats. In 2008, he was elected as a Barack Obama delegate to the Jefferson County, CD 6 and Colorado State Conventions.

2010 U.S. House of Representatives campaign

Flerlage challenged Republican incumbent Mike Coffman for the seat. Also running were Libertarian nominee Rob McNeally and Independent Michael S. Kearns. Mike Coffman defeated John Flerlage in the general election.

Personal life
He and his wife, Helena, a naturalized citizen from Sweden, moved to old Littleton in Arapahoe County in 1995 and then to their home in south Jefferson County in 1997.  He has volunteered regularly at the schools of his three children:  David (21), who graduated from Columbine High School and now attends Columbia University; Lisa (17), currently a junior at Columbine; and Karl (11).  Flerlage played varsity hockey in high school and college and continues to play on a local adult team.  He particularly enjoys coaching hockey. He started the Columbine Hockey Club and later became a high school coach at Columbine when that school formed a CHSAA (varsity) hockey team. Flerlage is a Level 5 coach with USA Hockey and is also a member of the Colorado Governor's Council for Physical Fitness .

References
An early start: South Jeffco Democrat eager to face off with Coffman in CD6, Columbine Courier, March 10, 2009
Democrat seeks to unseat Coffman, The News Press, February 10, 2010
Interview with David Sirota, AM 760, Denver, Colorado, September 15, 2009
Endorsement from regional newspaper, Aurora Sentinel, October 13, 2010
Dem puts up fight in GOP-heavy district, Denver Post, October 4, 2010
Flerlage/Coffman debate, Colorado Public Television, KBDI 12, October 8, 2010
Your Show-Congressional candidate John Flerlage interview 9News.com KUSA, September 5, 2010
South Jeffco's Flerlage touts his fiscal approach, Columbine Courier, October 12, 2010
Flerlage/Coffman debate, Colorado Election 2010, CD6 with Aaron Harber, KCDO Channel 3, October 17, 2010
Tim Danahey Show- interview with Flerlage, Castle Rock Radio, October 27, 2010

External links

John Flerlage for Congress official campaign site
 
Campaign contributions at OpenSecrets.org

United States Marine Corps officers
Living people
Colorado Democrats
1958 births
Colby College alumni
Politicians from Boston
People from Jefferson County, Colorado
American aviators
Delta Air Lines people
Military personnel from Massachusetts
Military personnel from Colorado